Veronica Findlay (born 6 January 1964) is a Jamaican sprinter. She competed in the women's 4 × 100 metres relay at the 1984 Summer Olympics.

References

External links
 

1964 births
Living people
Athletes (track and field) at the 1984 Summer Olympics
Jamaican female sprinters
Olympic athletes of Jamaica
Place of birth missing (living people)
Central American and Caribbean Games medalists in athletics
Olympic female sprinters